Virgibacillus phasianinus is a Gram-positive, rod-shaped, aerobic and motile  bacterium from the genus of Virgibacillus which has been isolated from the faeces of a Swinhoe's pheasant from the Seoul Grand Park in Korea.

References

Bacillaceae
Bacteria described in 2018